The Heat Flow and Physical Properties Package (HP3) is a science payload on board the InSight lander that features instruments to study the heat flow and other thermal properties of Mars. In March 2019, the mole burrowed a few centimeters, but then became unable to make progress due to various factors. In the following year further attempts were made to resolve the issues, with little net progress. On January 14, 2021, it was announced that efforts to drill into the martian surface using the device had been terminated.

HP3 was provided by the German Aerospace Center (DLR). The hammering mechanism inside the mole was designed by the Polish company Astronika and the Space Research Centre of the Polish Academy of Sciences under contract and in cooperation with DLR.

The Principal Investigator is Tilman Spohn from the German Aerospace Center.

Overview

The mission aims to understand the origin and diversity of terrestrial planets. Information from the HP3 heat flow package is expected to reveal whether Mars and Earth formed from the same material, and determine how active the interior of Mars is today. Additional science goals include determining the thickness of Mars' crust, the composition of its mantle, and thermal characteristics of the interior, such as the temperature gradient and heat flux.

Together with the seismometer, the mission will estimate the size of Mars' core and whether the core is liquid or solid. The vibrations generated by the mole will be monitored by SEIS to learn about the local subsurface.

In addition to the mole, HP3 includes an infrared radiometer (HP3-RAD) mounted to the landing platform, also contributed by DLR.

The HP3 heat flow probe is made up of the following subsystems:
Support Structure (SS) a housing that includes:
Engineering tether (ET) to communicate between the support structure to the lander
Science tether (TEM-P) a flex PCB with 14 platinum RTDs for measuring thermal properties of the regolith.
Tether length monitor (TLM) optical length meter for measuring the deployed length of the science tether 
Infrared radiometer (HP3-RAD) for measuring surface temperature.
 Back end electronics (BEE) electronic control unit
 Mole penetrometer for burrowing beneath the surface 
TEM-A active thermal conductivity sensor
 STATIL tiltmeter for determining orientation and direction of the mole.

Development

HP3 was conceived by Gromov V. V. et al. in 1997, and first flown as the PLUTO instrument on the failed 2003 Beagle 2 Mars lander mission. HP3 evolved further and it was proposed in 2001 for a mission to Mercury, in 2009 to the European Space Agency as part of the Humboldt payload on board the ExoMars lander, in 2010 for a mission to the Moon, and in 2011 it was proposed to NASA's Discovery Program as a payload for InSight Mars lander, known at that time as GEMS (Geophysical Monitoring Station). InSight was launched on 5 May 2018 and landed on 26 November 2018.

Mole penetrometer
The mole is described as a "self-hammering nail" and was designed to burrow below the Martian surface while trailing a tether with embedded heaters and temperature sensors. The goal is to measure the thermal properties of Mars' interior, and thus reveal unique information about the planet's geologic history.

It contains a heater to determine thermal conductivity during descent, and it trails a tether equipped with precise heat sensors placed at  intervals to measure the temperature profile of the subsurface.

The mole penetrator unit is designed to be placed near the lander in an area about 3-m long and 2-m wide.

For displacement, the mole uses a motor and a gearbox (provided by Maxon) and a cammed roller that periodically loads a spring connected to a rod that functions as a hammer. After release from the cam, the hammer accelerates downwards to hit the outer casing and cause its penetration through the regolith. Meanwhile, a suppressor mass travels upwards and its kinetic energy is compensated by gravitational potential and compression of a brake spring and wire helix on the opposite side of the mole. 

In principle, every  the probe puts out a pulse of heat and its sensors measure how the heat pulse changes with time. If the crust material is a thermal conductor, like metal, the pulse will decay quickly. Temperature sensors within the tether measure how rapidly this happens, which tells scientists the thermal conductivity of the soil. Together, these measurements yield the rate of heat flowing from the interior. 

As the mole burrows, it also generates vibrations that SEIS can detect, which may yield information about the Martian subsurface.

Penetration efforts
In March 2019, the HP3 began burrowing into the surface sand, but became stalled after several centimeters by what was initially suspected to be a large rock. Further analysis and testing with a replica model on Earth suggested the problem may be due to insufficient friction. In June 2019, more evidence for this was revealed when the support structure was lifted off of the HP3 mole. The Martian regolith appeared to be compressed, leaving a gap around the probe. 

A technique was implemented using the lander's robotic arm to press on the soil near the probe to increase soil friction. Ultimately, this method was not able to generate enough downward force, since the HP3 probe was at the limit of the arm's range. 

Instead, the team used the robotic scoop to pin the probe against the edge of its hole. This method appeared successful initially, as the probe continued to dig for two weeks, until it was flush with the surface. At this time, the exposed top of the probe was too small for the scoop to press against, so the scoop was re-positioned to press down on the soil near the probe. Unfortunately, this caused the probe to back out again due to unusual soil properties and low atmospheric pressure. As the probe bounced, loose soil filled the area beneath it and lifted the probe halfway out again. In January 2020, the team used the pinning method again, but once again the probe ejected after the scoop was repositioned.

In February 2020, the team reevaluated the risks of pushing the back cap of the mole directly using the robotic scoop, and determined the procedure to be acceptable. The procedure progressed slowly due to the requirement to reposition the scoop after each  of progress. In June 2020, the top of the mole reached the regolith surface. The mole entered the surface at an angle of 30 degrees from vertical, but this angle may decrease if a greater depth is reached. 

In July 2020, it was revealed that the mole was bouncing in place, underneath the scoop, suggesting insufficient friction to continue digging. A proposed solution was to fill the hole with sand in order to distribute pressure from the robotic scoop, thereby increasing friction. This procedure was performed in early August 2020. 

In late August 2020, a test indicated positive results. The scoop applied a downward force to the sand which covered the mole while hammering strokes were performed. This test resulted in a few millimeters of progress, and ultimately buried the instrument. In October 2020, the top of the mole was below the surface of Mars, and a decision was made to scrape two more scoops of regolith and tamp it down with the robotic scoop. Hammering operations were scheduled to continue in January 2021. 

Final attempts to get the probe deeper took place on 9 January 2021; after they proved unsuccessful, the decision was made to stop attempting to dig deeper. On January 14, 2021, NASA announced that, as the final attempt to bury the "mole" had failed, the team had given up, with the heat probe portion of the mission declared to be over. The lead scientist for the experiment, Tilman Spohn, said that, "Mars and our heroic mole remain incompatible."  The science team determined that the soil properties at the landing location were too different from what the instrument had been designed for. The team attempted many different remedies over several years to get the mole burrowing, but ultimately the attempts did not reach the target depth. The friction between the soil and the probe was not enough for the mole to hammer itself deeper.

The mole did achieve complete burial; the top of the mole is 2 to 3 centimetres below the Martian surface (with the mole itself being about 40 centimetres in length, the depth was thus about 43 centimetres). To be able to produce useful thermal measurements, the minimum required depth was specified as at least 3 metres deep. 

Although unsuccessful, the mole's operations did teach the mission team a lot about the soil at the Insight site, about conducting excavation/drilling on Mars, and about operating the lander's robotic arm. The mole-rescue effort used the arm in ways that were unplanned before the mission. The seismometer (SEIS), radio experiment (RISE) and the weather instruments (TWINS) continued to operate until the end of December 2022.

HP3-RAD Infrared Radiometer
The HP3 includes an infrared radiometer for measuring surface temperatures, contributed by DLR and based on the MARA radiometer for the Hayabusa2 mission.

The detector was protected by a removable cover during landing. The cover also serves as a calibration target for the instrument, supporting on-site calibration of the HP3-RAD.

Infrared radiometers were sent to Mars in 1969 as one of four major instruments on the Mariner 6 and Mariner 7 flyby spacecraft, and the observations helped to trigger a scientific revolution in knowledge about Mars. The Mariner 6 & 7 infrared radiometer results showed that the atmosphere of Mars is composed mostly of carbon dioxide (CO2), and revealed trace amounts water on the surface of Mars.

See also
Mini-TES, an infrared instrument on the 2003 Mars Exploration Rovers

References

External links
Hammering Mechanism for the HP3 Experiment onboard InSight. (PDF)

Geology of Mars
InSight
Spacecraft instruments